Magness may refer to:

Magness (surname)
Magness, Arkansas, a town in Independence County, Arkansas, United States

See also
Magness Arena, a sports arena in Denver, Colorado, United States
Magnes (disambiguation)